Wild Horse Reservoir is a man-made lake in Elko County, Nevada in the United States. The reservoir was initially created in 1937 by the construction of Wild Horse Dam. The original 1937 dam was left in place and is still partly visible. The newer dam doubled the size of the reservoir.

The reservoir impounds the Owyhee River for flood control and irrigation storage, part of the larger Duck Valley Irrigation Project.  The dam and reservoir are owned and administered by the BIA, and leased to the nearby Duck Valley Indian Reservation (Sho-Pai). Recreation on the lake includes fishing for trout, bass, catfish and perch.  The state of Nevada also maintains the adjacent Wild Horse State Recreation Area.

The small community of Wild Horse is located on the south shore.

Gallery

Climate
Wild Horse Reservoir has a humid continental climate (Dfb) bordering on a subalpine climate (Dfc). Summers are warm to hot with brisk nights, and tend to be drier than other times of the year. Winters are very chilly with heavy snowfall and nights near zero.

See also
List of dams in the Columbia River watershed

References

External links 

Wild Horse State Recreation Area

Dams in Nevada
Reservoirs in Nevada
Owyhee River
Buildings and structures in Elko County, Nevada
Dams completed in 1937
Dams completed in 1969
United States Bureau of Indian Affairs dams
Lakes of Elko County, Nevada
Shoshone
Paiute
1937 establishments in Nevada
Native American history of Nevada